Joseph Jenckes may refer to:

Joseph Jenckes Sr. (1599–1683), recipient of first machine patent in America at Lynn, Massachusetts
Joseph Jenckes Jr. (1628–1717), founder of Pawtucket, Rhode Island
Joseph Jenckes (governor) (1656–1740), governor of the Colony of Rhode Island and Providence Plantations